Wynton C. Hall is an American author and the managing editor and social media director of Breitbart News. He is also the owner of Wynton Hall & Co, a celebrity ghostwriting and communications agency, and a communication strategist for the Government Accountability Institute, a conservative think tank. He has ghostwritten several New York Times bestsellers, including Donald Trump's book Time to Get Tough.

References

Living people
University of Florida alumni
Texas A&M University alumni
American non-fiction writers
Breitbart News people
Ghostwriters
Year of birth missing (living people)